Sachchidanand Rai is an Indian politician and a Member of the Bihar Legislative Council from Bihar. Rai has won Member of the Bihar Legislative Council in 2022 as Independent Candidate and in 2017 as Bharatiya Janata Party Candidate.

References 

Living people
1963 births
Members of the Bihar Legislative Council